Sion Airport  (Military: LSMS) is the airport of the city of Sion, Switzerland and  is located 2.5 km southwest of Sion city in the Rhone Valley. The airport opened in 1935.

Airlines and destinations

The following airlines operate seasonal and seasonal charter flights at Sion Airport:

The nearest larger international airport is Geneva Airport, approx.  to the west, while the smaller Bern Airport is equidistant to the north.

Statistics
25,992 passengers were travelling through Sion Airport in the year 2019.

Military usage 
The Swiss Air Force uses Sion as one of their four jetfighter air bases, the others being Payerne, Meiringen and Emmen. It is known as Flugplatzkommando 14 Sion. In addition to the prop-types Pilatus PC-6, Pilatus PC-7, Pilatus PC-9 and Pilatus PC-21 as well as helicopters it uses Sion intensively with the fighter jets F/A-18 and F-5 Tiger. It is the home base of the militia pilot unit Fliegerstaffel 19 Swans with F-5E. Sion Airport is, at both ends of the runway, equipped with retractable arresting gear devices (used by the F/A-18 and in case of a problem by the F-5).

Due to the redimension of the Swiss Air Force, it was planned that the Air Force would leave Sion after 2017 and Sion would be used by civil aviation only, acting only as alternate airfield for the Air Force.

See also
 Transport in Switzerland

References

Notes

External links

 Official website
 

Sion
Buildings and structures in Valais
Sion, Switzerland
Military airbases in Switzerland